Inge van Dijk (born 6 May 1975) is a Dutch politician, serving as a member of the House of Representatives since the 2021 general election. She represents the political party Christian Democratic Appeal (CDA).

Before becoming an MP, Van Dijk had been a member of the Gemert-Bakel municipal council between 2001 and 2018, being her party's  in two elections. She became an alderwoman in 2018 and has also chaired CDA Brabant between 2015 and 2020.

Early life and education 
Van Dijk was born in the North Brabant city Helmond in 1975, and she moved at age one to the nearby village Bakel. Her father worked as a gas fitter. She attended the Helmond high school Dr. Knippenbergcollege and studied business administration at HAS University of Applied Sciences in 's-Hertogenbosch in the years 1994–99.

Career 
She took a job at Rabobank as internal account manager business relations in 1999 and would continue working for that company until she became an alderwoman in 2018. She served at several branches and at the national office in several positions including product manager. While working for Rabobank, she was a member of the Gemert-Bakel municipal council and volunteered at a number of local organizations including handball club Acritas, where she was a trainer, coach, and board member until 2014.

Van Dijk joined the municipal council in 2001, a few years after the municipalities Gemert and Bakel had merged. She has told that she and her father had campaigned against the reorganization and that she had decided to become politically active because of that experience. She became the CDA's  during the 2014 Gemert-Bakel municipal election, having been eighth on the party list in the previous election. She succeeded Harrie Verkampen, who had been leading the party in Gemert-Bakel for several decades. Her party managed to bring an end to a period of four years without having a plurality in the council. In November 2015, Van Dijk also became the chair of CDA Brabant.

She was again her party's  during the 2018 municipal election. Her party again received a plurality of votes, and Van Dijk vacated her council seat in May to become a full-time alderwoman responsible for economic and sport policy. Because of this position, she quit her job at Rabobank. In July 2019, Van Dijk survived a motion of no confidence. Her coalition was against plans to build a new swimming pool due to the financial risk involved and instead wanted to renovate an existing one. Under her leadership as chair of CDA Brabant, the party formed a coalition with, among other parties, the populist Forum for Democracy in 2020. A majority of CDA Brabant members (56%) had supported the coalition, that was controversial due to ideological disagreements, in a referendum. The previous coalition had collapsed because the CDA had left it. In May 2020, one of the four alderwomen of Gemert-Bakel left, and Van Dijk's portfolio changed; she also became responsible for finances and real estate and surrendered sport policy.

House of Representatives (2021–present) 
Van Dijk ran for member of parliament during the 2021 general election, being placed fourth on the CDA's party list. In November 2020 – shortly after her position had been announced – she stepped down as CDA Brabant chair. She was elected, receiving 16,851 preference votes, and was sworn into office on 31 March. Van Dijk is the CDA's spokesperson for economic affairs, the interior (excluding housing), the financial sector, and sport (formerly also kingdom relations), and she is on the Committees for Digital Affairs, Economic Affairs and Climate Policy, Finance, the Interior, Kingdom Relations, and Public Expenditure as well as on the Procedure Committee. In the House, she proposed to provide €10 million per year in funding from the national government for local political parties next to the already existing €27 million in funding for national parties. She also wanted to spend part of a fund from the European Union on providing free Internet for people with a low income.

Van Dijk was her party's  in Gemert-Bakel in the 2022 municipal elections.

Personal life 
Van Dijk has been living in the North Brabant village of Gemert since 2020, where she lives with her partner and three stepchildren. Before that, she resided in Bakel.

Her former home in Bakel became the subject of municipal politics in 2019, because the zoning regulations only allowed the building and the neighboring building to be used as homes accompanying farms. She had tried to change those regulations at the Council of State, but a nearby farmer filed an objection fearing stricter environmental regulations. The municipal council eventually changed the zoning regulations such that both houses could be used as homes without farms.

Decorations
 Order of Orange-Nassau
 Member (26 April 2019)

References 

1975 births
Living people
21st-century Dutch politicians
21st-century Dutch women politicians
Aldermen in North Brabant
Christian Democratic Appeal politicians
Members of the House of Representatives (Netherlands)
Members of the Order of Orange-Nassau
Municipal councillors in North Brabant
People from Gemert-Bakel